The Macomb Area Conference (abbreviated to MAC) (formerly known as the Macomb Athletic Conference) is a high school sports league located in Southeastern Michigan. It is a member of the Michigan High School Athletic Association (MHSAA). There are currently 36 members, spread across Macomb County, St. Clair County, Oakland County, and Wayne County.

The MAC offers sports for both boys and girls, including boys and girls cross country, boys football, boys and girls basketball, boys baseball, and girls softball, boys and girls soccer, boys and girls swimming, girls volleyball, boys and girls track and field, wrestling, boys hockey, and boys and girls tennis.

League History
The MAC was formed in 1986 through the merger of the Macomb Conference and the Bi-County Conference, and began competition in September 1987.

Charter members

Expansion
First Expansion
Brablec was closed and consolidated with Roseville High School in 1989. Roseville then joined the MAC the same year in place of Brablec.

Second Expansion
In 1990 the Eastern Michigan League was disbanded and all its former members joined the MAC. 
Eastpointe
Grosse Pointe South
Macomb L'Anse Creuse North
Mt. Clemens
New Baltimore Anchor Bay
Port Huron
Port Huron Northern

Third Expansion
In 1992, Warren High and C. S. Mott High consolidated and became Warren Mott High School, which joined the MAC in place of South Lake, which left to join the Macomb-Oakland Athletic Conference the same year.

Fourth Expansion
In 1996, both the St. Clair Area League and the Macomb-Oakland Athletic Conference were disbanded. All six of the former members of the SCAL and four of the eight schools from the MOAC (specifically, all the schools located in Macomb County) joined the MAC that same year.

St. Clair Area League:
Algonac‡
Imlay City†
Marine City
Marysville
Richmond†
St. Clair

Macomb-Oakland Area Conference:
Center Line
Warren Fitzgerald
Warren Lincoln
St. Clair Shores South Lake*

In addition, Dakota High School also joined the MAC in 1996 after being built in Macomb Township the previous year, making for a total of 11 schools joining the conference that year.

† -Both Imlay City and Richmond left in 1999 to join the Southern Thumb Athletic Association
‡ -Algonac left in 2002 to join the newly formed Blue Water Area Conference
* -South Lake rejoined the MAC after leaving four years prior

Fifth Expansion
In 2004, Madison Heights Madison and Madison Heights Lamphere, from the Oakland Activities Association, and New Haven, which previously ran an independent schedule, joined the MAC.

Sixth Expansion
In 2008, Clawson, from the Metro Conference, joined the MAC.

In 2016, Mt. Clemens left the MAC to seek an independent affiliation.

Seventh Expansion
In 2019, Hazel Park, from the Oakland Activities Association, joined the MAC.

Current members

Former Members

Membership Timeline with Football Divisions

Football
NOTE: Statistics are as of the end of the 2020 season.

Red Division

White Division

Blue Division

Gold Division

Silver Division

Bronze Division

MAC Championships

{| class="wikitable collapsible collapsed" width=450px
|-
! colspan=4 | Red Division Champions
|-
! Year !! School !! Conference !! Overall
|-
|1987 ||Sterling Heights || align = "center"|6-0 || align = "center"|10-1 
|-
|1988 ||Utica Eisenhower || align = "center"|6-0 || align = "center"|11-1 
|-
|1989 ||Sterling Heights StevensonUtica Eisenhower || align = "center"|3-13-1 || align = "center"|7-27-2
|-
|1990 ||Clinton Township Chippewa ValleyUtica Eisenhower || align = "center"|6-16-1 || align = "center"|8-29-2
|-
|1991 ||Utica Eisenhower || align = "center"|7-0 || align = "center"|9-1
|-
|1992 ||Utica Eisenhower || align = "center"|7-0 || align = "center"|11-1
|-
|1993 ||Utica Eisenhower || align = "center"|4-0 || align = "center"|10-1
|-
|1994 ||Utica Ford || align = "center"|5-0 || align = "center"|9-1
|-
|1995 ||Sterling Heights Stevenson || align = "center"|4-0 || align = "center"|11-1
|-
|1996 ||Sterling Heights Stevenson || align = "center"|4-0 || align = "center"|12-1
|-
|1997 ||Sterling Heights Stevenson || align = "center"|5-0 || align = "center"|11-1
|-
|1998 ||Sterling Heights Stevenson || align = "center"|5-0 || align = "center"|11-1
|-
|1999 ||Sterling Heights Stevenson || align = "center"|5-0 || align = "center"|9-2
|-
|2000 ||Utica Eisenhower || align = "center"|5-0 || align = "center"|13-1
|-
|2001 ||Utica EisenhowerSterling Heights StevensonClinton Township Chippewa Valley || align = "center"|4-14-14-1|| align = "center"|12-28-212-2
|-
|2002 ||Utica EisenhowerMacomb DakotaClinton Township Chippewa Valley || align = "center"|4-14-14-1 || align = "center"|8-311-27-3
|-
|2003 ||Utica Eisenhower || align = "center"|5-0 || align = "center"|13-1
|-
|2004 ||Utica Eisenhower || align = "center"|5-0 || align = "center"|10-1
|-
|2005 ||Sterling Heights Stevenson || align = "center"|5-0 || align = "center"|10-1
|-
|2006 ||Macomb Dakota || align = "center"|4-1 || align = "center"|13-1
|-
|2007 ||Macomb Dakota || align = "center"|5-0 || align = "center"|14-0
|-
|2008 ||Sterling Heights StevensonMacomb Dakota || align = "center"|4-14-1 || align = "center"|10-29-2
|-
|2009 ||Sterling Heights Stevenson || align = "center"|5-0 || align = "center"|13-1
|-
|2010 ||Romeo || align = "center"|5-0 || align = "center"| 9-2
|-
|2011 ||Utica Eisenhower || align = "center"|5-0 || align = "center"|11-2
|-
|2012 ||Macomb Dakota || align = "center"|5-0 || align = "center"|10-2
|-
|2013 ||Macomb Dakota || align = "center"|5-0 || align = "center"|11-1
|-
|2014 ||Macomb Dakota || align = "center"|4-1 || align = "center"|8-3
|-
|2015 ||Macomb Dakota || align = "center"|4-1 || align = "center"|9-3
|-
|2016 ||Utica Eisenhower || align = "center"|5-0 || align = "center"|12-1
|-
|2017 ||Utica Eisenhower || align = "center"|5-0 || align = "center"|11-1
|-
|2018 ||Clinton Township Chippewa Valley || align = "center"|5-0 || align = "center"|14-0**
|-
|2019
|Clinton Township Chippewa Valley
|5-0
|9-1
|-
|2020
|Sterling Heights Stevenson
Macomb Dakota
|4-1
4-1
|7-2
6-2
|-
|2021
|Sterling Heights Stevenson
Romeo
|4-1
4-1
|10-3
9-2
|}

{| class="wikitable collapsible collapsed" width=450px
|-
! colspan=4 | White Division Champions
|-
! Year !! School !! Conference !! Overall
|-
|1987 ||RomeoGrosse Pointe NorthWarren Cousino || align = "center"|3-13-13-1 || align = "center"|6-36-35-4
|-
|1988 ||Romeo || align = "center"|4-0 || align = "center"|7-2 
|-
|1989 ||RomeoGrosse Pointe North || align = "center"|4-14-1 || align = "center"|7-25-4 
|-
|1990 ||Romeo || align = "center"|6-1 || align = "center"|6-3
|-
|1991 ||Fraser || align = "center"|6-1 || align = "center"|8-3 
|-
|1992 ||Fraser || align = "center"|7-0 || align = "center"|10-1 
|-
|1993 ||Fraser || align = "center"|6-0 || align = "center"|10-2 
|-
|1994 ||Fraser || align = "center"|5-0 || align = "center"|7-3 
|-
|1995||Port Huron || align = "center"|4-0 || align = "center"|5-4 
|-
|1996||Port Huron || align = "center"|4-0 || align = "center"|7-2 
|-
|1997||Fraser|| align = "center"|5-1 || align = "center"|6-3 
|-
|1998||Fraser || align = "center"|6-0 || align = "center"|9-1 
|-
|1999||Macomb Dakota || align = "center"|6-0 || align = "center"|10-2
|-
|2000||Utica || align = "center"|6-0 || align = "center"|8-2
|-
|2001 ||Sterling Heights || align = "center"|6-0 || align = "center"|8-3 
|-
|2002 ||New Baltimore Anchor BayPort Huron NorthernRomeoUtica Ford || align = "center"|4-24-24-24-2 || align = "center"|5-45-47-46-4
|-
|2003 ||Utica Ford || align = "center"|6-0 || align = "center"|6-4 
|-
|2004 ||Grosse Pointe North || align = "center"|6-0 || align = "center"|9-2 
|-
|2005 ||Romeo || align = "center"|6-0 || align = "center"|8-2 
|-
|2006 ||Warren CousinoGrosse Pointe NorthRomeo || align = "center"|5-15-15-1|| align = "center"|11-1 8-37-3 
|-
|2007 ||Warren Cousino || align = "center"|6-0 || align = "center"|11-1
|-
|2008 || Warren Mott || align = "center"|5-0 || align = "center"|6-4
|-
| 2009 || Warren Mott || align = "center"|5-0 || align = "center"|8-2
|-
| 2010 || Utica || align = "center"|5-0 || align = "center"|7-3
|-
|2011 || Warren Cousino || align = "center"|5-0 || align = "center"|6-4
|-
| 2012 || Port Huron || align = "center"|5-0 || align = "center"|7-3
|-
| 2013 || Warren Mott || align = "center"|5-0 || align = "center"|10-1
|-
| 2014 || Port HuronRomeo || align = "center"|4-14-1 || align = "center"|7-36-4
|-
| 2015 || Romeo || align = "center"|5-0 || align = "center"|13-1
|-
| 2016 || Grosse Pointe South || align = "center"|5-0 || align = "center"|8-4
|-
| 2017 || Grosse Pointe South || align = "center"|5-0 || align = "center"|5-5
|-
| 2018 || Grosse Pointe South || align = "center"|5-0 || align = "center"|8-2
|-
|2019
|Grosse Pointe South
|5-0
|7-3
|-
|2020
|Anchor Bay
Warren Mott
|3-1
3-1
|4-3
8-2
|-
|2021
|Anchor Bay
|5-0
|7-3
|}

{| class="wikitable collapsible collapsed" width=450px
|-
! colspan=4 | Blue Division Champions
|-
! Year !! School !! Conference !! Overall
|-
|1987 || Harrison Township L'Anse Creuse || align = "center"|4-0 || align = "center"|7-2 
|-
|1988 || Harrison Township L'Anse Creuse || align = "center"|4-0 || align = "center"|8-1 
|-
|1989 || Warren Cousino || align = "center"|5-0  || align = "center"|7-2
|-
|1990 || Clinton Township Clintondale || align = "center"|7-0  || align = "center"|8-2
|-
|1991 || Clinton Township Clintondale || align = "center"|7-0  || align = "center"|8-1
|-
|1992 || Grosse Pointe NorthMt. Clemens || align = "center"|6-16-1|| align = "center"|7-28-3
|-
|1993 || Warren Cousino || align = "center"|4-0 || align = "center"|7-2 
|-
|1994 || Warren CousinoGrosse Pointe NorthRoseville || align = "center"|4-14-14-1 || align = "center"|6-35-46-3
|-
|1995 || Grosse Pointe North || align = "center"|4-0 || align = "center"|7-3 
|-
|1996 || Warren Mott || align = "center"|4-0 || align = "center"|7-2
|-
|1997 || Romeo || align = "center"|6-0 || align = "center"|7-2 
|-
|1998 || Sterling Heights || align = "center"|6-0 || align = "center"|7-3 
|-
|1999 || Eastpointe || align = "center"|5-1 || align = "center"|5-4 
|-
|2000 || Harrison Township L'Anse CreuseNew Baltimore Anchor Bay  || align = "center"|5-15-1  || align = "center"|8-37-2
|-
|2001 || Harrison Township L'Anse CreuseRomeo Warren Cousino|| align = "center"|5-15-1 5-1|| align = "center"|7-39-29-2
|-
|2002 || Warren Mott || align = "center"|5-1 || align = "center"|6-4 
|-
|2003 || Grosse Pointe SouthPort Huron || align = "center"|5-15-1 || align = "center"|7-46-4
|-
|2004 || Warren CousinoPort Huron || align = "center"|5-15-1 || align = "center"|6-47-3 
|-
|2005 || Warren Cousino || align = "center"|6-0 || align = "center"|7-3 
|-
|2006 || Warren Mott || align = "center"|6-0 || align = "center"|7-3 
|-
|2007 || Macomb L'Anse Creuse NorthPort Huron || align = "center"|5-15-1 || align = "center"|6-37-3 
|-
|2008 || Sterling Heights || align = "center"|5-0 || align = "center"|5-4 
|-
| 2009 || Grosse Pointe South || align = "center"|5-0 || align = "center"|7-3 
|-
| 2010 || New Baltimore Anchor Bay || align = "center"|5-0 || align = "center"|7-3 
|-
| 2011 || Port Huron || align = "center"|5-0 || align = "center"|10-2 
|-
| 2012 || Grosse Pointe South || align = "center"|5-0 || align = "center"|8-2 
|-
|2013 || Grosse Pointe SouthMacomb L'Anse Creuse North || align = "center"|4-14-1  || align = "center"|6-48-2
|-
|2014 || Warren Cousino || align = "center"|5-0 || align = "center"|5-5
|-
|2015 || Grosse Pointe NorthWarren Cousino || align = "center"|4-14-1 || align = "center"|5-45-4
|-
|2016 || Warren Cousino || align = "center"|5-0 || align = "center"|8-2
|-
|2017 || Grosse Pointe NorthRosevillePort Huron || align = "center|4-14-14-1 || align = "center"|6-36-44-5
|-
|2018 || Port Huron Northern || align = "center"|5-0 || align = "center"|10-2
|-
|2019
|Port Huron Northern
|5-0
|8-2
|-
|2020
|Port Huron
|5-0
|8-1 
|-
|2021
|Port Huron
|5-0
|6-4
|}

{| class="wikitable collapsible collapsed" width=450px
|-
! colspan=4 | Gold Division Champions
|-
! Year !! School !! Conference !! Overall
|-
|1993 || Mt. Clemens || align = "center"|6-0  || align = "center"|7-3 
|-
|1994 || Mt. Clemens || align = "center"|5-0  || align = "center"|7-2
|-
|1995 ||Harrison Township L'Anse CreuseMacomb L'Anse Creuse North  || align = "center"|2-12-1 || align = "center"|6-35-4 
|-
|1996 ||New Baltimore Anchor Bay  || align = "center"|4-0 || align = "center"|6-3 
|-
|1997 ||MarysvilleWarren Woods Tower  || align = "center"|5-15-1|| align = "center"|7-37-3
|-
|1998 ||Marine City  || align = "center"|6-0  || align = "center"|8-2
|-
|1999 ||Marine City  || align = "center"|5-0 || align = "center"|10-1
|-
|2000 ||Marysville  || align = "center"|5-0  || align = "center"|10-1
|-
|2001 ||Marine City  || align = "center"|5-0  || align = "center"|11-1
|-
|2002 ||Marine City  || align = "center"|5-0  || align = "center"|11-1 
|-
|2003 ||Marysville  || align = "center"|5-0  || align = "center"|9-1
|-
|2004 ||Marine City  || align = "center"|7-0  || align = "center"|11-1 
|-
|2005 ||Marine CityMarysville  || align = "center"|6-16-1  || align = "center"|10-28-2
|-
|2006 ||Marine City  || align = "center"|6-0  || align = "center"|11-1
|-
|2007 ||Marine City  || align = "center"|6-0  || align = "center"|13-1**
|-
|2008 ||Marine City  || align = "center"|5-0  || align = "center"|10-1
|-
|2009 || Marine City  || align = "center"|5-0  || align = "center"|12-1
|-
|2010 || Madison Heights MadisonMarine City  || align = "center"|4-14-1  || align = "center"|9-310-2
|-
| 2011 || Marine City || align = "center"|5-0 || align = "center"|13-1
|-
|2012 || Marine City  || align = "center"|5-0  || align = "center"|8-2
|-
| 2013 || St. Clair || align = "center"|5-0  || align = "center"|11-2
|-
|2014 || Marine City  || align = "center"|5-0  || align = "center"|10-1
|-
|2015 || Marine CityMarysvilleSterling Heights || align = "center"|4-14-14-1 || align = "center"|6-47-37-3
|-
|2016 || Marysville || align = "center"|5-0 || align = "center"|10-1
|-
|2017 || Marine City || align = "center"|5-0 || align = "center"|8-3
|-
|2018 || Warren Woods-Tower || align = "center"|5-0 || align = "center"|9-2
|-
|2019
|Eastpointe 
L’anse Creuse

Sterling Heights
|4-1
4-1

4-1
|6-4
6-4

6-4
|-
|2020
|Eastpointe 
|5-0
|8-1
|-
|2021
|St. Clair
|5-0
|8-3
|}

{| class="wikitable collapsible collapsed" width=450px
|-
! colspan=4 | Silver Division Champions
|-
!Year !! School !! Conference !! Overall
|-
|1995 || Clinton Township Clintondale || align = "center"|4-0 || align = "center"|6-3 
|-
|1996 || Warren Woods-Tower || align = "center"|4-0 || align = "center"|7-2
|-
|1997 || Mt. ClemensWarren Fitzgerald || align = "center"|6-16-1 || align = "center"|6-36-3 
|-
|1998 || Warren Fitzgerald || align = "center"|7-0 || align = "center"|8-1 
|-
|1999 || Clinton Township Clintondale || align = "center"|6-0 || align = "center"|8-2 
|-
|2000 || Clinton Township Clintondale || align = "center"|6-0 || align = "center"|11-1 
|-
|2001 || Warren Woods-Tower || align = "center"|6-0 ||align = "center"|10-1 
|-
|2002 || Clinton Township Clintondale || align = "center"|5-0 || align = "center"|8-3 
|-
|2003 || Clinton Township Clintondale || align = "center"|5-0 || align = "center"|10-2 
|-
|2004 || New Haven || align = "center"|6-0 || align = "center"|8-2
|-
|2005 || Madison Heights Madison || align = "center"|6-0 || align = "center"|8-2 
|-
|2006 || Madison Heights Madison || align = "center"|7-0 || align = "center"|13-1 
|-
|2007 || Madison Heights Madison || align = "center"|7-0 || align = "center"|12-1**
|-
|2008 || Warren Fitzgerald || align = "center"|5-0 || align = "center"|11-1
|-
|2009 || Madison Heights Madison || align = "center"|5-0 || align = "center"|11-1 
|-
| 2010 || Clinton Township ClintondaleSt. Clair Shores LakeviewMadison Heights LamphereWarren Fitzgerald || align = "center"|3-23-23-23-2 || align = "center"|6-47-46-47-4
|-
| 2011 || Marysville || align = "center"|5-0 || align = "center"|8-2
|-
| 2012 || Madison Heights Madison || align = "center"|4-1 || align = "center"|8-2
|-
| 2013 || Madison Heights Madison || align = "center"|5-0 || align = "center"|11-1
|-
| 2014 || Madison Heights Madison || align = "center"|5-0 || align = "center"|9-3
|-
|2015 || Madison Heights Madison || align = "center"|5-0 || align = "center"|9-2
|-
|2016 || Madison Heights MadisonSt. Clair Shores South LakeWarren Fitzgerald || align = "center"|4-14-14-1 || align = "center"|6-47-38-2
|-
|2017 || Madison Heights  Madison || align = "center"|5-0 || align = "center"|12-1
|-
|2018 || Madison Heights  Madison || align = "center"|5-0 || align = "center"|13-1
|-
|2019
|Marine City
|5-0
|10-1
|-
|2020
|Marine City
|5-0
|8-2
|-
|2021
|Marine City
|5-0
|13-1
|}

{| class="wikitable collapsible collapsed" width=450px
|-
! colspan=4 | Bronze Division Champions
|-
!Year !! School !! Conference !! Overall
|-
| 2008 || Warren Lincoln || align = "center"|5-0 || align = "center"|8-2
|-
| 2009 || Clawson || align = "center"|5-0 || align = "center"|5-4
|-
| 2010 || St. Clair Shores South Lake || align = "center"|5-0 || align = "center"|8-2
|-
| 2011 || St. Clair Shores South Lake || align = "center"|5-0 || align = "center"|8-2
|-
| 2012 || Clinton Township Clintondale || align = "center"|5-0 || align = "center"|9-1
|-
| 2013 || Clinton Township Clintondale || align = "center"|5-0 || align = "center"|9-1
|-
| 2014 || Clawson || align = "center"|5-0 || align = "center"|6-4
|-
| 2015 || ClawsonWarren Lincoln || align = "center"|4-14-1 || align = "center"|6-45-4
|-
| 2016 || ClintondaleNew HavenWarren Lincoln || align = "center"|3-13-13-1 || align = "center"|4-54-54-5
|-
| 2017 || Madison Heights Lamphere || align = "center"|4-0 || align = "center"|5-5
|-
| 2018 || Center Line || align = "center"|4-0 || align = "center"|6-4
|-
|2019
|Clawson 
|5-0
|7-4
|-
|2020
|Madison Heights Lamphere
|5-0
|8-1
|-
|2021
|Madison Heights Lamphere
|5-0
|7-3
|}

{| class="wikitable collapsible collapsed" width=450px
|-
! colspan=4 | St. Clair Division Champions
|-
!Year !! School !! Conference !! Overall
|-
| 1996 || Marine CityMarysvilleRichmond || align = "center"|4-14-14-1 || align = "center"|9-27-37-2
|}

{| class="wikitable collapsible collapsed" width=450px
|-
! colspan=4 | Macomb-Oakland Division Champions
|-
!Year !! School !! Conference !! Overall
|-
| 1996 || Center LineSt. Clair Shores South LakeWarren Lincoln || align = "center"|2-12-12-1 || align = "center"|4-46-26-3
|}

**- denotes that the team won a state championship title that year

References

Sources
 MAC official website
 MHSAA official website
 Michigan High School Football

Michigan high school sports conferences